Revisionist Press was an imprint of the American book publisher Gordon Press, that began in 1972 in Brooklyn, New York.  It published and reprinted many unusual books which were listed for unusually high prices in the publication Books in Print.  Many had trouble ordering the books, causing some businesses and universities to refuse to do business with them.  For example, the American Booksellers Association wrote "Our members have complained about making pro-forma payments to this publisher in advance, on orders which were never filled or filled too late to be useful."  The combination of Revisionist Press' unusual publications and their failure to always fulfill orders fueled a conspiracy theory that they were running a US government watch list of people interested in certain titles.

Revisionist Press closed in 2001 and their remaining inventory was acquired by the bookstore and publisher Run for Cover!, also of New York City.

External links
Run for Cover!

Book publishing companies based in New York (state)
Publishing companies established in 1972